Club de Futbol Cruz Azul or simply  Cruz Azul is a professional football club based in Mexico City, Mexico. It competes in the Liga MX, the top division of Mexican football. Because "azul" means "blue" in Spanish, the club has traditionally worn a blue home kit.

Founded in Jasso, Hidalgo, the club moved officially to Mexico City in 1971, where it had already registered a great presence and activity since its beginnings. Estadio Azteca, the nation's largest sports venue, served as their home venue until 1996, when they moved to the Estadio Ciudad de los Deportes, which was renamed Estadio Azul. After 22 years the team returned to the Azteca at the conclusion of the 2017-18 Liga MX season. Its headquarters are in La Noria, a suburb within Xochimilco in the southern part of Mexico City.

Cruz Azul has been in the Primera División champion nine times, trailing Toluca's 10, C.D. Guadalajara's 12, and Club América's 13. Cruz Azul's six titles makes it the second-most successful club in the history of the CONCACAF Champions League, the most prestigious international club competition in North American football, trailing intracity rival Club América. Cruz Azul was also the first CONCACAF team to reach the final of the Copa Libertadores, the most prestigious club competition in South American football (which invited top Liga MX clubs from 1998 to 2017), losing on penalties to Argentine football giants Boca Juniors in 2001. In the 1968–69 season, Cruz Azul was the first CONCACAF club (and third worldwide) to complete a rare Continental Treble, winning the Mexican Primera División championship, the Copa México national tournament, and the CONCACAF Champions League.

In its 2014 Club World Ranking, the International Federation of Football History & Statistics placed Cruz Azul as the 99th-best club in the world and the third-best club in CONCACAF. According to several polls published, Cruz Azul is the third-most popular team in Mexico, behind only C.D. Guadalajara and Club América. It is also the second most supported team in its hometown, Mexico City, behind América and ahead of Pumas UNAM.

History

Background and foundation
Carlos Garces López was a footballer and athlete, included in the Mexico national team for the 1924 and 1928 athletics and football. As a Midfielder, he was part of Club América's founding squad and was a key player to their dominance of the Primera Fuerza in the mid-1920s. Garces López was included in the debut Mexico national football team in 1923, playing in Mexico's debut series of official international matches against Guatemala. At the time, football in Mexico was not a lucrative occupation. Garces López was a licensed dentist providing dental care at the cement company Cemento Cruz Azul located in the small town of Jasso, Hidalgo. He would travel regularly to Mexico City from Jasso to train and play for América.

In 1925, Cemento Cruz Azul had voted to establish a company baseball team as the sport was popular in the town of Jasso. Garces López personally lobbied for many months to change the official company sport to football. American employees initially receiving resistance but the company directors relented to a referendum for determination of the company team's main sport. The March 22, 1927 election favored football. Cemento Cruz Azul replaced the company baseball diamond with a football pitch. The football team was officially established two months later on May 22 where Garces López was appointed head coach.

Amateur era (1927–1960)

Initially, Cemento Cruz Azul played in local tournaments organized by the company against teams representing towns neighboring Jasso. The team was composed solely of company workers for the next three decades. The club was widely successful in amateur tournaments during the 30s and 40s, winning 15 consecutive state level league titles.

Establishment as a co-operative (1931–1934)

By 1931, Cemento Cruz Azul had experienced a series of economic troubles during the Great Depression. Due to the loss of demand and production of cement and other construction materials, Cemento Cruz Azul faced bankruptcy and was bought by cement company La Tolteca on March 1, 1931, for 1 million pesos. The liquidation of Cemento Cruz Azul was anticipated by 192 workers of Cemento Cruz Azul who unionized and sued the executives of the company to prevent the transfer of the property which was set for October 15, 1931. The government of Hidalgo ruled in favor of the workers after it was shown La Tolteca  had premeditated intentions of liquidation. The workers assumed control of the industrial facilities on November 2. On May 21, 1932, the governor of Hidalgo, Bartolomé Vargas Lugo, decreed the 192 workers of Cemento Cruz Azul as collective owners of the plant, exercising eminent domain. Part of the agreement, all 192 workers who assumed responsibility of the plant agreed to pay the state of Hidalgo 1.3 million pesos over the course of 10 years. The company changed its name to Cooperativa Manufacturera de Cemento Portland La Cruz Azul, S.C.L, reestablishing itself as a cooperative on January 29, 1934. The debt was settled on November 2, 1941, 10 years after workers took ownership of the plant. In celebration, Cruz Azul organized a match against R.C. España, that ended in a 0–0 draw.

This scenario of the club's formation encourages its working-class facade.

Success in amateur competitions (1932–1952)

From 1932 to 1943, Cemento Cruz Azul won 15 consecutive league titles in an amateur league in the state of Hidalgo. On 8 different occasions, the club represented the state of Hidalgo in national amateur tournaments. From the mid-1930s to the late 1940s, the club regularly traveled to Mexico City to face the reserve teams of Atlante, Necaxa, Marte, and R.C. España, playing at Parque Necaxa to great success. By 1937, Cruz Azul had garnered a considerable following both in Hidalgo and Mexico City. Around this period in time Guillermo Álvarez Macías began playing on the team as a midfielder.

Foundations for professional status (1953–1960)

On December 10, 1953, Guillermo Álvarez Macías was appointed general manager of Cemento Cruz Azul. He had been employed at the cooperative since 1931 at the age of 12 when his father died. Initially employed as an automotive mechanic, Álvarez Macías spent over two decades at the company, rising through the ranks. A self-proclaimed socialist, Álvarez Macías laid plans to transform the cooperative into a functioning town, building schools, restaurants, paving roads, in hopes to modernize and "share social and economic progress, to raise the standard of living of the worker and his family." In his goal to promote social well-being among members of the co-op, Álvarez Macías invested into cultural and recreational activities. This included investing much more into the football club whose proceeds were used to provide the worker-players with better living conditions.

In 1958, team captain and machinist, Luis Velázquez Hernández, served as the club's ambassador to the Mexican Football Federation to lobby for official membership on the club's behalf. Velázquez Hernández met Paulino Sánchez in Mexico City, who had ties to prominent football executives. They met with Joaquín Soria Terrazas and Ignacio Trelles to discuss membership in the federation for the club. Sánchez vouched in favor of Cruz Azul, citing their continual success in the amateur and reserve tournaments. Much to the displeasure of Álvarez Macías who asserted the club was not ready for professional football.

In preparation for federation membership, Paulino Sánchez assumed the position as head manager of the club. Due to regulations, teams were required to have a reserve team. Lafayette, a club experiencing financial troubles located in Colonia Moctezuma, had many talented players that could potentially be Cruz Azul's reserves. Under the recommendation of Sánchez, Cruz Azul purchased the Lafayette team. The acquisition was completed sometime in 1960. Plans to construct a club stadium that complied to the standards set by the Mexican Football Federation were conceived in 1960. In 1961, ground broke to construct Estadio 10 de Diciembre and finished in 1963.

Despite not possessing federation membership and due to Sánchez's personal contacts, Cruz Azul was invited to compete in the 1960-61 edition of Copa de la Segunda División de México, a competition sanctioned by the Mexican Football Federation. The club's debut game was played on April 2, 1961, in Jasso against Zamora, ending in 2–1 in favor of Cruz Azul. The second leg was played on April 9, 1961, ending in a 3–3 draw. They faced Querétaro in the next round winning 1–0 on aggregate. Cruz Azul was eliminated by UNAM. Following their impressive performance in the cup, the Mexican Football Federation granted Cruz Azul an opportunity to register as a professional team.

Professional level and rapid rise to prominence (1961–1968)

The club was officially registered to compete in the nation's second tier professional league for the 1961-62 season.

Due to the regulations by the Mexican Football Federation that prohibited the official usage of company names by clubs, the club changed its name to Cooperativa Cruz Azul from Cemento Cruz Azul

Promotion to Primera División (1964)

Jorge Marik, a Hungarian coach who previously managed Atlas and Atlante, signed on to manage the club in 1961. Cruz Azul won a direct promotion to Primera División after Marik led the club to the 1st position on the general table with 45 points (19 wins, 7 draws, and 4 losses) in the 1963–64 Mexican Segunda División season.

Following the club's promotion, Estadio 10 de Diciembre underwent renovations on March 6, 1964, rebuilding the wooden stands and dressing rooms which were compliant to regulations.

Cruz Azul finished their first season in the top flight, the 1964–65 Mexican Primera División season, in 8th place with 10 wins, 9 draws, 11 losses.

After poor results, Marik left the club after the 1965–66 Mexican Primera División season where Cruz Azul finished in 13th place out of 16 teams on the league table. Walter Ormeño became the team's interim coach, managing 3 games, before the club signed Raúl Cárdenas October 20, 1966.

Establishment in the top flight (1969–1980)

Domination of Primera División (1969–1975)

1968–69 season: first championship, treble

During the 1968–69 season under the direction of Cárdenas, Cruz Azul won their first Copa México,  their first Primera División title, and their first CONCACAF Champions' Cup. After only 4 years in the nation's top flight, Cruz Azul managed to complete a treble, being the first club to do so in not only Mexico but in the CONCACAF region as well.

1970–1980

Cruz Azul finished in second place on the general table for the 1969–70 Mexican Primera División season.
The club was awarded the 1970 CONCACAF Champions' Cup on December 15, 1970, after Saprissa and Transvaal withdrew from the second phase of the competition in September citing economic issues.

Between 1970 and 1980, Cruz Azul led the Primera División with six league tournament championships; four under Cárdenas and the last two under Ignacio Trelles. This powerful version of the team earned the nickname La Máquina Celeste (The Blue Machine), which continues as one of the official nicknames of the team.

On December 18, 1976, Guillermo Álvarez Macías died of a heart attack at the age of 56 while awaiting President Portillo for a meeting.

First drought (1981–1997)
Throughout the 1980s, Cruz Azul remained one of the most competitive teams in the league. Despite their consistent form and financial wealth, the club was unable to obtain a title. This drought would last for another 17 years.

Billy Álvarez presidency

In 1988, Guillermo Héctor Álvarez Cuevas, the son of the late Guillermo Álvarez Macías, assumed the position of general manager at the cooperative Cemento Cruz Azul and presidency of Cruz Azul.

1990–1995

For the 1991–92 season, Cruz Azul signed Carlos Hermosillo. An América icon who was fundamental to America's 1988–89 league championship victory against Cruz Azul, Hermosillo's signing was met with ambivalence by the club's supporters. Hermosillo, however, quickly established himself as an integral part of the team where he was the league's top goal scorer for 3 consecutive years (1993-94, 1994-95, 1995-96 -  27, 35, 26 goals respectively).

In the 1994-95 season, the club finished 3rd in the league's overall table and reached a league final for the first time in 6 years where they were defeated 3–1 on aggregate by Necaxa.

1996–1997: end of drought and second treble
July 20 of 1996 marked the end of a 16 year long championship drought for Cruz Azul. The team managed by Víctor Manuel Vucetich won the CONCACAF Champions' Cup single round-robin tournament held in Guatemala City. Cruz Azul finished 1st on the table after defeating Seattle Sounders 11–0 at Estadio Flores. Vucetich also lead Cruz Azul to a Copa México title, winning the 1996–97 Copa México at the Estadio 10 de Diciembre after defeating Toros Neza 2–0.

Under the management of Luis Fernando Tena, Cruz Azul won the CONCACAF Champions' Cup on August 24, 1997, for the second consecutive year after defeating LA Galaxy 5–3 in the final. 
On December 7, 1997, Cruz Azul, who finished 2nd in the general standings of the league table, won the Invierno 1997 league tournament the against table leaders León via golden goal. This marked an end to the club's 17 year long league drought as well as achieving Cruz Azul's second continental treble.

The second leg of the series is largely remembered in part of a self-admittedly inexplicable act of aggression committed by León's goalkeeper Ángel Comizzo towards Carlos Hermosillo that handed the championship title to Cruz Azul. During the 15th minute of the first half of extra time, Comizzo shoved and kicked Cruz Azul striker Hermosillo in the face while inside the penalty box. Referee Arturo Brizio only witnessed the shove but did not see the kick as he turned his head away when Comizzo kicked Hermosillo. The penalty was called in favor of Cruz Azul while Comizzo did not get sent off. Hermosillo, whose face was bleeding profusely, took the penalty kick and scored. As the golden goal rule applied, Cruz Azul won the match and their eighth league title.

Second trophy drought (1998–2013)

Copa Libertadores 2001

In 2001, Cruz Azul was invited to a tournament between select Mexican and Venezuelan teams that would then compete in the Copa Libertadores, a tournament of the best South American teams. The two best teams of this qualifying tournament earned immediate placement on the roster.

Cruz Azul was one of the seeded teams and reached the 2001 Copa Libertadores final match. Cruz Azul started the tournament in Group 7 along with Sao Caetano, Defensor Sporting, and Olmedo. Cruz Azul finished as leader of the group with 13 points. In the round of 16 Cruz Azul faced Cerro Porteño. The first leg was played in Asunción, where Cruz Azul lost 2–1. The second leg was played in Mexico City, where Cruz Azul won the game 3–1. The aggregate score was 4–3 in favor of Cruz Azul and they moved on to the quarterfinals.

In the quarterfinals, Cruz Azul faced River Plate of Argentina. The first leg of the match was played in Buenos Aires and ended in a 0–0 draw. The second leg was played in Mexico City and Cruz Azul won 3–0. Cruz Azul was having a great run and faced Rosario Central at the semifinals. The first leg was played in Mexico City and Cruz Azul won the game 2–0. The second leg was played in Rosario, a very exciting match that ended in a 3–3 draw in favor of Cruz Azul due to the 2–0 victory in the first leg.

In the final match, Cruz Azul played against the Argentine giants Boca Juniors. Cruz Azul lost at home the first leg 1–0, but came back to win the second leg with the same score at Boca's La Bombonera stadium with Paco Palencia scoring the goal. Until then, no team had ever won a Copa Libertadores final match there. After overtime, the championship was decided by penalty kicks where Boca Juniors prevailed. Still, Cruz Azul surprised everybody with the unprecedented feat of reaching the final and defeating established Argentinian teams such as Rosario Central and River Plate.

2005 abduction of Rubén Omar Romano

After leaving a pre-season practice session on July 16, 2005, manager Rubén Omar Romano was cornered by two stolen vehicles and abducted by 5 men. A ransom note was later found demanding of Romano's family $500,000. Assistant coach Isaac Mizrahi managed the team during Romano's absence. After 65 days, Romano was found and rescued unharmed. Federal agents raided a house in a poor neighborhood where Romano and his kidnappers were situated. The agents arrested 7 conspirators who were under the orders of convicted abductor Jose Luis Canchola.

During the hostage incident, the club had decided to not renew Romano's contract upon the end of Apertura 2005 and instead offered the position to Mizrahi following stellar results. Mizrahi accepted the offer while Romano was in captivity. Romano stated he felt betrayed and his friendship with Mizrahi was severed.

Series of runner-ups and last-minute losses (2008–2013)
The club was regularly regarded to be contenders for championship titles due to their formidable and financial stature in the league. Throughout this period in time however, Cruz Azul competed in many league and tournament finals only to finish runners-up. In these championship matches, as well as regular season games, Cruz Azul initially would be favorites to win, often having the advantage over the opponent, but would ultimately draw or lose near the end of full stoppage time. As a result, the club garnered a negative reputation of being cursed and the club would often be subject to ridicule. The term cruzazulear, defined as "the act of losing a game after victory is practically assured", is used to describe Cruz Azul losing a match in the aforementioned manner beginning sometime in 2013. The usage of the term was so prevalent that it is officially recognized by the Royal Spanish Academy in 2020.

Clausura 2008
During the Clausura 2008 season, the team played a great tournament, finishing in second place. The team won 9 games, had 4 draws and lost only 4 times. In the quarterfinals they played against the Jaguares losing 1–0 in the first leg and winning 2–1 in the second leg with goals of Pablo Zeballos and Miguel Sabah. They moved to the semifinals against the San Luis, the first leg was played in San Luis and Cruz Azul won 0–1 with a goal of Miguel Sabah. In the second leg, Cruz Azul and the San Luis played a formidable match that ended 1–1 with goals of Eduardo Coudet and Pablo Zeballos. In the final, Cruz Azul played against Santos Laguna, second place in the tournament. In the first leg, Cruz Azul lost 1–2 at home, and a 1–1 draw in the second leg meant that Santos were champions with a 3–2 aggregate score.

Apertura 2008
For the Apertura 2008 season, Cruz Azul finished in 5th place on the overall table. The team had 7 wins, 5 draws, and 5 losses.

In the quarterfinals, Cruz Azul defeated Pumas UNAM with an aggregate score of 3–1, moving on to the semifinals against Atlante; the first leg was played in Mexico City, and Cruz Azul won 3–1. In the second leg, Cruz Azul tied Atlante 1–1 in Cancún, which meant that Cruz Azul reached the Final for the second consecutive time. In the final, Cruz Azul played against Toluca, both teams tied on winning Mexican titles (at that time with 8 each). The first leg played in Mexico City ended with a dramatic 0–2 with a victory for Toluca, and in the second leg, which was played at Estadio Nemesio Díez, Cruz Azul won 0–2, which put the aggregate score at 2–2, which meant extra time had to be played. No goals were scored in extra time and the match went into a penalty shootout, where Toluca won 7–6 over Cruz Azul and won the title, after Alejandro Vela missed his penalty, even though he was the one that scored the opening goal of the game for Cruz Azul. In the 72nd minute, César Villaluz was fouled in the penalty box and suffered a serious injury, but Cruz Azul were unable to substitute him as they had no remaining substitutes, so the team was forced to defend the scoreline with 10 men for almost fifty minutes, which possibly could´ve had a big outcome on the result, as well as the decision to not award a penalty.

2008–09 CONCACAF Champions League 

The team qualified for the 2008–09 CONCACAF Champions League by finishing league runner-ups. In the first stage, they finished second in Group A, qualifying for the knockout stage. In the quarter-finals, they defeated Pumas UNAM 2–0 on aggregate; in the semi-finals, they defeated the Puerto Rico Islanders on penalties with 10 men, after coming back from a 2–0 loss in the first leg. In the final against Atlante, they lost the first game 0–2 and tied the second 0–0, losing on aggregate.

Clausura 2009

In the Clausura 2009, the team had the worst tournament in club history en route to a last-place finish. They accumulated just 13 points in 17 games, winning only two games, with seven draws and eight losses. The Club sacked their manager Benjamín Galindo with one game left in the Clausura. He was replaced for the remainder of the season by Robert Siboldi who was then coaching Cruz Azul's affiliate in Hidalgo.

Apertura 2009

In the Apertura 2009, the team had signed Enrique Meza to manage the team and signed several players, including the best goalkeeper of the previous Mexican tournament Jose de Jesus Corona, Argentine striker Emanuel "Tito" Villa, Ramon Nuñez, and Emilio Hernandez. The team finished the regular season in second place with 33 points, winning 11 games of 17 played, and qualifying for the playoffs; Villa was the top scorer of the tournament with 17 goals. In the quarter-finals, they beat Puebla 7–6 on aggregate, and in the semi-finals, they beat Monarcas Morelia 2–1 on aggregate. In the final, they lost to Monterrey 6–4 on aggregate, meaning this was now their third consecutive time failing to win a league finals.

In April 2012, Cruz Azul changed their official name from Club Deportivo, Social y Cultural Cruz Azul, A.C. to simply Cruz Azul Fútbol Club, A.C.

2009–10 CONCACAF Champions League
In the 2009–10 CONCACAF Champions League, the team had a good tournament, finishing first in Group C and qualifying for the final stage of playoffs. In the quarter-finals, they defeated Panamanian team Árabe Unido 4–0 on aggregate, and then in the semifinal round, they played against the Mexico City rivals Pumas UNAM, losing the first leg 1–0 but winning the return leg 5–1 at Estadio Azul. In the final, against another Mexican club, Pachuca, they had the chance to win their 6th CONCACAF championship, winning the first game at home 2–1, but lost at Pachuca's home 1–0 with a last minute goal, meaning Pachuca won the championship by the away goals rule, and Cruz Azul missed the opportunity to participate in the 2010 FIFA Club World Cup.

Liga MX Clausura/Copa MX Clausura 2013
During the 2013 season, Cruz Azul started slow but regained confidence after beating Club América in the Copa MX semi-finals and winning the Copa MX final over the Atlante. After Cruz Azul won the Copa MX, their Liga MX performance improved and they were considered one of the contenders for the title due to a good streak. They would face bitter rivals the Club America in a historical final series of the "Clásico Joven." Cruz Azul was up 2–0 in aggregate when the Club America made a miraculous comeback with goals in the 89th from Aquilvado Mosquera and 93rd minute from Moises Munoz who was a goalkeeper of the second leg; Club America would go on to win 4–2 on penalties.

End of Second drought and CONCACAF Champions League win (2014–2019) 
On April 23, 2014, after defeating Toluca, Cruz Azul won their 6th CONCACAF championship, a record at the time, and winning their first trophy in seventeen years. This gave Cruz Azul a berth at the 2014 FIFA Club World Cup, where they would earn a fourth-place finish.

From the Clausura 2014 to the Clausura 2017, Cruz Azul had been unable to qualify to the liguilla playoffs for six consecutive tournaments. Cruz Azul qualified for the liguilla for the first time in three years in the Apertura 2017 season. However, they were eliminated in the quarterfinals by the América, who advanced as the higher-ranked seed, with an aggregate score of 0–0. On 27 November 2017, Cruz Azul announced that Paco Jémez would not renew his contract for the following season.

In the Liga MX Clausura 2018 tournament, Cruz Azul ended up ranked 12th and failed to qualify for the liguilla. The club also finished last place in the group stage of the Clausura 2018 Copa MX.
On 7 May 2018, the club announced director of football Eduardo de la Torre's contract had ended and would be replaced by Ricardo Peláez, former director of football for Club América.

On 31 October, they would face Monterrey in the Apertura 2018 Copa MX Final, winning 2–0 with goals from Elías Hernández and Martín Cauteruccio. It was their first trophy in the tournament since 2013.

Cruz Azul faced América in a rematch of the Clausura 2013 final for the Apertura 2018 final. The first leg was played on 13 December 2018 which ended in a scoreless draw. The second leg was played three days later and ended in a 2–0 victory for América. With this defeat, Cruz Azul extended its 21-year-old championship drought in the league for at least another season.

Administrative vicissitude (2020)

Indictment and ousting of board of directors

In May 2020, Guillermo Alvarez Cuevas, then president of the club, was indicted by Mexican authorities on multiple accounts of insurance fraud, racketeering, extortion, tax evasion, and money laundering. On July 26, an arrest warrant was issued for Alvarez along with board directors Victor Manuel Garcés, Miguel Eduardo Borrell, and Mario Sánchez Álvarez for alleged ties to organized crime. Alvarez subsequently resigned from his position at the club in August 2020 after 32 years as acting president. Interpol is currently searching for Alvarez in 195 countries and as of June 2, 2021, remains at large.

2020 season
On December 6, 2020, Cruz Azul faced UNAM on the second semi-final leg of the Guardianes 2020 Liga MX final phase. Although Cruz Azul had a 4–0 lead at the beginning of the second leg, they lost the match 0–4, thus tying in aggregate. Because UNAM won the clubs' week 17 match 1–0, they held the tiebreaker and advanced to the final.

End of league title curse (2021–present) 
On May 30, 2021, Cruz Azul ended its 23-year Primera División championship drought by beating Santos Laguna 2–1 on aggregate at Estadio Azteca, earning its ninth league championship, after having lost seven finals in the last thirteen years.

Colors and badge

The club's crest has stayed relatively consistent since its foundation in the 1920s, with a blue cross in a white circle surrounded by a red square, with the club's name above and below. As years went by and titles were won, the crest was modified to proclaim the Cruz Azul's achievements, adding a larger blue circle/frame after the 1971–72 season showing three stars for each Liga MX championship win (showing eight stars since the end of the 1997 season).

Past crests

Stadium

The team currently plays in the Estadio Azteca in Mexico City. The Cruz Azul's training facilities are named "La Noria", which are located in Xochimilco.

The team returned to the Estadio Azteca in the Apertura 2018 season after spending 22 years at Estadio Ciudad de los Deportes, which has been slated to be demolished. The team has indicated that it intends to build a new stadium, but solid plans such as location have not materialized.

Squad

Squad

Management
Listed on the official website of Cruz Azul.

Coaching staff

Reserve teams

Cruz Azul Lagunas
Reserve team that plays in the Liga TDP, the fourth level of the Mexican league system.

Former players

Managerial history

Honours

Domestic
Primera División / Liga MX: 9
1968–69, Mexico '70, 1971–72, 1972–73, 1973–74, 1978–79, 1979–80, Invierno 1997, Guardianes 2021

Segunda División: 1
1963–64

Copa México / Copa MX: 4
1968–69, 1996–97, Clausura 2013, Apertura 2018

Campeón de Campeones: 3
1969, 1974, 2021

Supercopa de la Liga MX: 1
2022

Supercopa MX: 1
2019

International
CONCACAF Champions' Cup / Champions League: 6
1969, 1970, 1971, 1996, 1997, 2013–14
Leagues Cup: 1
2019

Nicknames

The Cruz Azul has a rich variety of nicknames over its history, listed chronologically:

 Cementeros (cement workers): As a result of affiliation with the Cruz Azul Cement, the first name refers directly to the employees of the company, as the team originally was formed with them. Over the years, the concept is extended not only to those who worked in the cooperative, but the construction workers in general.
 Liebres (hares): When the team was promoted to the Primera División in the mid-1960s, the club played a fast and physical game.  These characteristics, coupled with their mostly white uniforms, led fans to compare the players of those years with the hares which abound in the town.  The nickname took hold, and an anthropomorphic hare is often used as a mascot and icon to represent the Cruz Azul. While some modern fans believe that the mascot is a rabbit, the club's board has officially declared that it is a hare.
 La Máquina (the machine, the locomotive): This nickname is fed by several sources of inspiration.  One is based on a railway that brought the cement from the Cruz Azul plant, in the former village of Jasso (south of Tula de Allende), to Mexico City. After moving to Mexico City, the Cruz Azul was the most dominant club in Mexico during the 1970s, reinforcing the nickname as a comparison to the image of a locomotive sweeping through their opponents. The name may have been borrowed from the similarly nicknamed River Plate club that motored through its opponents in the Argentine Primera División in the 1940s. It has been suggested that reporter Rugama Angel Fernandez was the first to publish an article with the name La Máquina for the Cruz Azul. The nickname has some variations, including The Sky-blue Machine (La Máquina Celeste), The Blue Machine (La Máquina Azul) and The Cement Machine (La Máquina Cementera).

The Cheerleaders (Las Celestes)
The club has its own official cheerleading club, who were included as part of the institution in 2004 and since then, act as cheerleaders pre-match and during the halftime break.
"Las Celestes" have become part of the tradition of the club. Which is the only Mexican team that  include official cheerleaders as part of their group.

Popularity and rivalries

Popularity
Since its inception the team was supported mainly by cement workers. After promotion to the Primera División in the 1960s, more people began to follow the team. In the 1970s when the team managed six of their nine titles even more people joined the group of supporters of the team, until now that in this 21st century according to various surveys is the third team with the most supporters in Mexico, behind the Club Guadalajara and the América respectively, above the club UNAM.

The club became infamous in Mexico for not having won a Mexican league title from 1997 to 2021. For an English-speaking audience, the so-called "Cruz Azul curse" is likened to Neverkusen for German team Bayer Leverkusen, the Curse of the Bambino for MLB baseball's Boston Red Sox, or the Curse of the Billy Goat for MLB's Chicago Cubs. The commonality derives from these teams' inability, no matter the quality of the team relative to their opponents in a tournament or a championship match, to win a championship. The "curse" was broken after their winning of the Guardianes 2021 final match versus Santos Laguna, after scoring 2–1 on May 30, 2021.

Rivalries
National Rivalries:
 Main Rivalry: the "Clásico Joven"  vs. the Club América.

Records

 Cruz Azul has the distinction of being the only Mexican football club to win the North American treble – winning the Liga MX, Copa MX, and Champions League in 1997.
 Cruz Azul is the Mexican club with the second-most titles at international level, behind only América (six titles in the CONCACAF Champions League, plus a runners-up finish twice in 2009 and 2010, one Leagues Cup title, as well as one runners-up finish in the Copa Libertadores in 2001).
 Cruz Azul is both the Mexican and overall club with the second-most titles in the CONCACAF Champions League, with six (behind only América, with seven).
 Cruz Azul holds the record for most consecutive wins in the history of the Primera División: 12 wins in the Guard1anes 2021.
 Cruz Azul is the Mexican team with the highest number of playoff games played (43), including rounds of reclassification.
 Cruz Azul is the first Mexican team to win a final crown via a "golden goal" (1997).
 Cruz Azul has played (14) and lost (8) the most playoff finals, and has the second-most final wins, with six (tied with Toluca and UNAM).
 Cruz Azul is one of three teams in the history of the Primera División have to win league titles in three consecutive seasons (succeeding in 1971–72, 1972–73 and 1973–74), the other two teams being América, who did so decade later, and Guadalajara.
 Cruz Azul is the fastest team to become champions after being promoted, winning only five years after promotion in the 1968–69 season.
 Cruz Azul became the fastest team to win seven league titles, accomplishing the feat with only fifteen years playing in Mexico's Primera División.

Club statistics and records

Professional era (since 1964)
Seasons in Primera División: 62
Seasons in 2nd Division o Primera "A": 4.
Playoff for the title: 44
Final for the title: 19 (68–69, 69–70, MÉX 70, 71–72, 72–73, 73–74, 78–79, 79–80, 80–81, 86–87, 88–89, 94–95, Inv. 97, Inv. 99, Clau. 08, Aper. 08, Aper. 09, Clau. 13, Aper. 18, Guardianes 2021)
1st place: 14
Relegated to 2nd Division o Primera "A": 0
Promotion to the 1st Div: 1 (1963–64)
Final position more repeated: 1st (14 times)
Best place in Primera División:
 In long tournaments: 1st (1968/1969, Mexico 1970, 1971/1972, 1972/1973, 1973/1974, 1978/1979, 1995/1996)
 In short tournaments: 1st (Winter 1998, Winter 2000, Apertura 2006, Apertura 2010, Clausura 2014, Apertura 2018, Guardianes 2021)
 Worst place in Primera División:
 In long tournaments: 18th of 20 teams: 1989–90
 In short tournaments: 18th of 18 teams: Clausura 2009
 Highest score achieved :
 The national tournament: 8–2 vs. Toros Neza (1993–94).
 In international tournaments: 12–2 against the  Leslie Verdes in 1988 CONCACAF Champions' Cup and 11–0 against the  Seattle Sounders in the 1996 CONCACAF Champions' Cup
 Highest score against:
 The national tournament: 0–7 against América (2022).
 In international tournaments: 1–6 against the  Fénix in the 2003 Copa Libertadores
 Most points in a season :
 In long tournaments: 57 (1978–79)
 In short tournaments: 41 (Guardianes 2021)
 Longest streak of games without losing :
 19 (round 18 from semifinal round of (1973–74).
Longest undefeated streak at home
 47 (1978–1980) (Mexican football record)
Most goals scored in a season :
 In long tournaments: 91 (1994–95).
 In short tournaments: 41 (Invierno 1998).
Most wins in a season: 22, Season (1971–72)
Most draws in a season: 17, (1989–90)
Most defeats in a season: 13, (1982–83) and (1989–90)
Consecutive wins in a season: 12, (Guardianes 2021) (Mexican football record)
More games without conceding: 5, season (1975–76), and (1983–84)
Most consecutive wins: 12, (Guardianes 2021) (Mexican football record)
Most consecutive draws: 5, (1973–74)
Most consecutive games without a win: 11, (1965–66)
Fewest wins in a season: 2, Clausura 2009
Fewest draws in a season: 0, Apertura 2009
Fewest defeats in one season: 1, PRODE 85, Invierno 1998
Player with the most goals in a season:  Carlos Hermosillo with 35 in (1994–95)
Most titles won
 Head Coach:  Raúl Cárdenas
11 titles: Primera División (1968–69, México 1970, 1971–72, 1972–73, 1973–74), Copa México (1968–69), Campeon de Campeones (1968–69, 1973–74), CONCACAF Champions' Cup (1969, 1970, 1971)
 Player:  Fernando Bustos
13 titles: Primera División (1968–69, México 1970, 1971–72, 1972–73, 1973–74, 1978–79), Segunda División (1963–64), Copa México (1968–69), Campeon de Campeones (1968–69, 1973–74), CONCACAF Champions' Cup (1969, 1970, 1971)

Top goalscorers

Symbols:

LIG: Ligue
CUP: Cup
SPC: Campeón de Campeones
CON: CONCACAF Champions League
LIB: Copa Libertadores
FWC: FIFA World Club Cup
INA: Copa Interamericana
RCF: CONCACAF Cup Winners Cup

Tournament top scorers

  Horacio López Salgado 25 Goals in "1974–75"
  Carlos Hermosillo 28 Goals in "1993–94"
  Carlos Hermosillo 35 Goals in "1994–95"
  Carlos Hermosillo 26 Goals in "1995–96"
  Sebastián Abreu 19 Goals in "Verano 2002"
  Emanuel Villa 17 Goals in "Apertura 2009"
  Jonathan Rodríguez  9 Goals in "Clausura 2020”
  Jonathan Rodríguez  12 Goals in "Guardianes 2020”

Shirt sponsors and manufacturers

References

External links
 
 
 Esmas.com 

 
Association football clubs established in 1927
Football clubs in Mexico City
Liga MX teams
1927 establishments in Mexico
Works association football teams
CONCACAF Champions League winning clubs